Parapercis randalli is a fish species in the sandperch family, Pinguipedidae. It is found in Northwest Pacific near southern Taiwan. 
This species can reach a length of  TL.

Etymology
The fish is named in honor of John E. Randall (1924-2020), of the Bishop Museum in Honolulu.

References

Pinguipedidae
Taxa named by Hans Hsuan-Ching Ho
Taxa named by Shao Kwang-Tsao
Fish described in 2010